Asif Malikov (Azerbaijani: Asif Məlikov; born April 13, 1971 in İsmayıllı) is a retired Olympic weightlifter for Azerbaijan.

External links
 sports-reference
 Asif Malikov at Lift Up

1971 births
Living people
Azerbaijani male weightlifters
Weightlifters at the 1996 Summer Olympics
Weightlifters at the 2004 Summer Olympics
Olympic weightlifters of Azerbaijan
People from Ismailli District
European Weightlifting Championships medalists
World Weightlifting Championships medalists